The Dinner Game (literally Dinner of Fools) is a 1998 French comedy film written and directed by Francis Veber, adapted from his play Le Dîner de Cons. It became that year's top-grossing French film at the French box office (second overall behind Titanic).

Plot
Pierre Brochant, a Parisian publisher, attends a weekly "idiots' dinner", where guests, who are modish, prominent Parisian businessmen, must bring along an "idiot", whom the other guests can ridicule. At the end of the dinner, the evening's "champion idiot" is selected.

With the help of an "idiot scout", Brochant manages to find a "gem", François Pignon, a sprightly employee of the Finance Ministry (which Brochant, a tax cheat, loathes). Pignon has a passion for building matchstick replicas of famous landmarks. Shortly after inviting Pignon to his home, Brochant is suddenly stricken with back pain while playing golf at his exclusive country club. His wife, Christine, leaves him shortly before Pignon arrives at his apartment, as she realizes that he still wants to go to the "idiots' dinner". Brochant initially wants Pignon to leave, but instead becomes reliant on him, because of his back problem and his need to resolve his relationship problems.

He solicits Pignon's assistance in making a series of telephone calls to locate his wife, but Pignon blunders each time, including revealing the existence of Brochant's mistress, Marlene Sasseur (thinking that she is Brochant's sister, since her name sounds like "sa sœur"), to his wife Christine and inviting tax inspector Lucien Cheval to Brochant's house, where Brochant is forced quickly to hide most of his valuables in an attempt to disguise his tax evasion.
 
In the meantime, Brochant is able to make amends with an old friend, Juste Leblanc, from whom he stole Christine, and through the evening's events is forced to reassess his mistakes.

Cast
 Jacques Villeret as François Pignon
 Thierry Lhermitte as Pierre Brochant
 Francis Huster as Juste Leblanc
 Daniel Prévost as Lucien Cheval
 Alexandra Vandernoot as Christine Brochant
 Catherine Frot as Marlène Sasseur
 Edgar Givry as Jean Cordier
 Daniel Russo as Pascal Meneaux
 Bernard Alane as Pascal Meneaux's voice
 Christian Pereirra as Dr. Sorbier
 Pétronille Moss as Mademoiselle Blond

Critical response
The film was positively received by critics. On review aggregator Rotten Tomatoes, the film has an approval rating of 74% based on 46 reviews, with an average score of 6.8/10. On Metacritic, the film received a score of 73 based on 19 reviews, indicating "generally favorable reviews".

Accolades
At the 1999 César Awards, the film was honored with six nominations of which it won three. The categories it won were Best Actor for Jacques Villeret, Best Supporting Actor for Daniel Prévost and Best Screenplay for Francis Veber. It was nominated but did not win for Best Film, Veber as Best Director and Catherine Frot as Best Supporting Actress.

Soundtrack

Adaptations

References

External links
 
 
 
 

1998 films
1998 comedy films
French comedy films
1990s French-language films
Films directed by Francis Veber
Films with screenplays by Francis Veber
Films scored by Vladimir Cosma
French films based on plays
Films featuring a Best Actor César Award-winning performance
Films featuring a Best Supporting Actor César Award-winning performance
Films featuring a Best Actor Lumières Award-winning performance
Lionsgate films
Gaumont Film Company films
1990s French films
Films based on works by Francis Veber